Chatham railway station is located on the Lilydale and Belgrave lines in Victoria, Australia. It serves the eastern Melbourne suburb of Surrey Hills, and it opened on 1 April 1927.

History

Chatham station opened on 1 April 1927, and was named after nearby Chatham Road.

The station originally opened with the current island platform only. In December 1971, Platform 3 was provided when services on the third track from East Camberwell were extended through the station to Box Hill.

Platforms and services

Chatham has one island platform with two faces and one side platform. Platforms 1 and 2 (island platform) has a large red brick building, while the non-aligned Platform 3 features a small weatherboard shelter. All three platforms are linked by an underpass.

It is serviced by Metro Trains' Lilydale and Belgrave line services.

Platform 1:
  all stations and limited express services to Flinders Street
  all stations and limited express services to Flinders Street

Platform 2:
  all stations services to Lilydale
  all stations services to Belgrave

Platform 3:
  weekday all stations services to Lilydale; weekday all stations services to Blackburn
  weekday all stations services to Belgrave; weekday all stations services to Blackburn

References

External links
 Melway map at street-directory.com.au

Railway stations in Melbourne
Railway stations in Australia opened in 1927
Railway stations in the City of Boroondara